The Men's Slalom in the 2022 FIS Alpine Skiing World Cup consisted of ten events including the final. However, the slalom scheduled in Zagreb on 5 January was first delayed until 6 January due to bad weather and then cancelled in the middle of the first run (after 19 skiers) due to additional bad weather, leading to its removal from the schedule. Eventually, however, it was rescheduled for Flachau on 9 March, restoring the season to 10 events.

Going into the break for the 2022 Winter Olympics, the leader after two-thirds of the events was Lucas Braathen from Norway, who held a slim lead over his countryman Sebastian Foss-Solevåg. However, eight racers were still within 100 points (one race) of the lead. After the Olympics, the next two races were both won by another Norwegian, 2020 discipline champion Henrik Kristoffersen, who took over the lead with only two races remaining in the season. Kristofferson then won the season championship by finishing second in the final.

As discussed above, the season was interrupted by the 2022 Winter Olympics in Beijing, China (at the Yanqing National Alpine Skiing Centre in Yanqing District) from 6–19 February 2022.  The men's slalom was held at the "Ice River" course on 16 February 2022.

The World Cup final was held on Sunday, 20 March in the linked resorts of Courchevel and Méribel, France, which are located in Les Trois Vallées, on the Roc de Fer course at Méribel. Only the top 25 skiers in the World Cup downhill discipline and the winner of the Junior World Championship, plus athletes who have scored at least 500 points in the World Cup overall classification for the season, are eligible to compete in the final, and only the top 15 earn World Cup points.

Standings

DNS = Did Not Start
DNQ = Did Not Qualify for run 2
DNF1 = Did Not Finish run 1
DNF2 = Did Not Finish run 2
DSQ1 = Disqualified run 1
DSQ2 = Disqualified run 2
NE = Not Eligible for finals
Updated at 20 March 2021 after all events.

See also
 2022 Alpine Skiing World Cup – Men's summary rankings
 2022 Alpine Skiing World Cup – Men's Overall
 2022 Alpine Skiing World Cup – Men's Downhill
 2022 Alpine Skiing World Cup – Men's Super-G
 2022 Alpine Skiing World Cup – Men's Giant Slalom
 2022 Alpine Skiing World Cup – Men's Parallel
 World Cup scoring system

References

External links
 Alpine Skiing at FIS website

Men's slalom
FIS Alpine Ski World Cup slalom men's discipline titles